Grewia goetzeana is a species of flowering plant in the family Malvaceae sensu lato or Tiliaceae or Sparrmanniaceae. It is found only in Tanzania.

References

goetzeana
Endemic flora of Tanzania
Data deficient plants
Taxonomy articles created by Polbot
Plants described in 1900